The Yonge Street Agricultural Society was an agricultural society that operated under a general provincial charter which enabled the creation of such societies to develop community interest in the breeding of agricultural animals and plants. The society was based in Richmond Hill, Ontario.

History

The Yonge Street Agricultural Society was founded in 1849.  They organised the first Richmond Hill spring fair, held on May 24, 1849.  The governance of the society was done by a president, two or three vice presidents and a secretary-treasurer.  In addition to this the society had a large number of directors.  The primary activity of the society was the organisation and running of Richmond Hill's spring agricultural fair.  The society was disbanded in 1865.

The society was reformed in 1874 as the Richmond Hill and Yonge Street Agricultural Society.  The last spring fair in Richmond Hill was held in 1996.  By this point, Richmond Hill was suburban and no longer had enough agriculture in the community to support a fair.

See also

References 

Richmond Hill, Ontario
Organizations based in Ontario
Agricultural organizations based in Canada
Organizations established in 1849
1849 establishments in Ontario